The Star Awards for Toggle awards are a series of awards presented annually at the Star Awards, a ceremony that was established in 1994. It is presented by Toggle, a Mediacorp interactive service since 2012.

These Toggle awards can be based on any theme each year. For example, the first Toggle award for 2015 was the Toggle Outstanding Duke Award, which is given in honour of a Mediacorp male artiste who is one of the eight dukes that is deemed as the most popular among the television audience. The Toggle award for 2016 is Toggle Most Beloved Celebrity BFF Award. It is given in honour of a Mediacorp celebrity BFF (Best Friends Forever) pairing that is deemed as the most popular among the television audience.

The nominees are determined by a team of judges employed by Mediacorp; winners are selected by a majority vote from the public via online voting.

Recipients

 Each year is linked to the article about the Star Awards held that year.

References

External links 

Star Awards